This article refers to one of the former prefectures of Chad. From 2002 the country was divided into 18 regions.

Guéra was one of the 14 prefectures of Chad. Its capital was Mongo. Located in the south of the country, Guéra covered an area of 58,950 square kilometers and had a population of 306,253 in 1993, of which 263,843 were sedentary (rural: 219,884; urban: 43,959) and 42,810 were nomadic. The predominant ethno-linguistic groups were the Hadjerai (66.18%) and the Arabs (21.11%).

References

Prefectures of Chad

de:Guéra
fr:Guéra